Explosives and the Will to Use Them is the debut full-length studio album from Long Island punk band, Crime In Stereo. It was released in January, 2004 on Blackout Records.

Track listing
All songs written by Crime In Stereo
"Amsterdamned!" – 2:06    
"Warning: Perfect Sideburns Do Not Make You Dangerous" – 2:32    
"Play It Loud Fuckers" – 2:55    
"What a Strange Turn of Events" – 2:11    
"Compass and Square" – 2:03    
"If You Think Were Talking About You, We Are" – 2:03    
"Barfight on Bedford Ave" – 1:51    
"It Ain't All Hugs and Handshakes" – 2:29    
"Here's to Things Gone Wrong" – 2:57    
"No Gold Stars for Nationalism" – 1:03    
"Terribly Softly" – 2:01    
"Arson at 563" – 4:19

Credits
 Kristian Hallbert – vocals
 Alex Dunne – guitar
 Shawn Gardiner – guitar
 Mike Musilli – bass
 Scotty Giffin – drums
 Recorded at Water Music Recorders, Hoboken, New Jersey, US
 Produced by Ted Young and Crime In Stereo
 Engineered by Ted Young and John Bender
 Mixed by Arik Victor
 Mastered by Alan Douches

References

External links
 Blackout Records album page

2004 debut albums
Crime in Stereo albums